River House, also known as The Ferry Farm, is a historic plantation house located near Millwood, Clarke County, Virginia. It was built about 1820, and is a two-story, five bay, rubble limestone dwelling in a vernacular Federal-style. It has a gable roof with wide interior-end chimneys.  Also on the property is a rare three-part slave or servants' house and an early smokehouse.

It was listed on the National Register of Historic Places in 1993. It is located in the Greenway Historic District.

References

Plantation houses in Virginia
Houses on the National Register of Historic Places in Virginia
National Register of Historic Places in Clarke County, Virginia
Federal architecture in Virginia
Houses completed in 1820
Houses in Clarke County, Virginia
Historic district contributing properties in Virginia